Victor Kraatz,  (born April 7, 1971) is a Canadian former ice dancer. In 2003, he and his partner, Shae-Lynn Bourne, became the first North American ice dancers to win a World Championship.

Personal life 
Born on April 7, 1971 in West Berlin, Victor Kraatz grew up in Switzerland. At age 15, he moved to Vancouver, British Columbia, Canada.

Kraatz married Finnish ice dancer Maikki Uotila on June 19, 2004 in Helsinki, Finland. They have two sons – Oliver, born September 14, 2006 in North Vancouver, British Columbia; and Henry, born on July 10, 2010.

Career 
Kraatz began to skate in 1980. In Switzerland, former pair skaters Mona and Peter Szabo taught him basic skills. His first ice dancing partner was Analisa Beltrami of Switzerland.

After his move to Canada, Kraatz was coached by Joanne Sloman in Vancouver, British Columbia. In the early 1990s, he switched to Eric Gillies and Josee Picard in Montreal, Quebec. He had a partnership with Taryn O'Neill.

Partnership with Bourne
On April 20, 1991, Kraatz began skating with Shae-Lynn Bourne, who had been a pair skater until that time. Bourne tried out with him in Boucherville, Quebec on the suggestion of a coach, Paul Wirtz.

During their career, Bourne/Kraatz were coached at various times by Tatiana Tarasova, Natalia Dubova, Uschi Keszler, Marina Klimova and Sergei Ponomarenko, and Nikolai Morozov. For the 1997–98 season, their free dance was modeled after Riverdance, with footwork instruction provided by Riverdance lead dancer Colin Dunne. Bourne/Kraatz became known for their deep edges and soft knees. They were credited with perfecting and popularizing the hydroblading technique.

Bourne/Kraatz missed the 2000 Four Continents and 2000 World Championships due to Bourne's knee surgery. In spring 2000, they changed coaches, moving to Tatiana Tarasova and Nikolai Morozov in Newington, Connecticut.

Bourne/Kraatz withdrew from their 2002 Grand Prix events due to Bourne's injury. They won their tenth Canadian national title and their third Four Continents title. Bourne/Kraatz went on to become the first World champions in ice dancing from North America, winning gold at the 2003 World Championships in Washington, D.C. They retired from competition at the end of the season.

On October 21, 2003, they announced the end of their partnership; while Bourne enjoyed show skating, Kraatz said he wanted "to experiment with other things and follow up on other dreams that I have". In January 2007, they were inducted into the Skate Canada Hall of Fame.

Kraatz represented CPA Boucherville in Boucherville, Quebec.

Later career
After retiring from skating, Kraatz studied marketing and began working at a marketing agency in Yaletown, British Columbia.

In 2005, Kraatz joined the B.C. Centre of Excellence. He went on to coach Allie Hann-McCurdy / Michael Coreno, Carolina Hermann / Daniel Hermann, and Danielle O'Brien / Gregory Merriman. In the winter of 2012–13 season, he switched to coaching hockey players.

Programs 
(with Bourne)

Results
(with Bourne)

GP: Part of Champions Series from 1995–96 season, renamed Grand Prix series in 1998–99

References

External links 

 
 

1971 births
Living people
Canadian male ice dancers
Figure skaters at the 1994 Winter Olympics
Figure skaters at the 1998 Winter Olympics
Figure skaters at the 2002 Winter Olympics
Figure skaters from Berlin
Figure skaters from Vancouver
German emigrants to Canada
Recipients of the Meritorious Service Decoration
Olympic figure skaters of Canada
World Figure Skating Championships medalists
Four Continents Figure Skating Championships medalists
20th-century Canadian people
21st-century Canadian people